Mantra Lingua is a UK-based publishing house, publishing award-winning multi-lingual resources for children's literacy and science.

In association with the Royal National Institute of Blind People, the company developed The PenFriend, a device that allows blind people to attach and read audio labels on everyday objects.

Its Talking Phonics was the winner of the 2010 Educational Resource Awards (ERA), Best Early Years Educational Resource with ICT.

References

Book publishing companies of the United Kingdom